The Cambridge Companions to Literature and Classics form a book series published by Cambridge University Press. Each book is a collection of essays on the topic commissioned by the publisher.

Volumes (sortable table)

See also
Cambridge Companions

Cambridge University Press books
Series of books
Cambridge Companions to Literature and Classics